Navan is a town in County Meath, Ireland.

Navan may also refer to:

Places
 Navan Fort, an ancient hillfort or roundhouse in County Armagh, Northern Ireland
 Navan, Gilan, north-west Iran, a village
 Navan, Ontario, Canada, a rural community
 Navan District, Oyón, Peru
 Navan (Parliament of Ireland constituency), based on the Irish town

Railway stations in the Irish town
 Navan railway station
 Navan Junction railway station
 Navan Central railway station
 Navan North railway station

Sport
 Navan Gaels GAA, in the Irish town, a defunct club, mostly played Gaelic football
 Navan Hibernians GAC, in the Irish town, a defunct hurling club
 Navan O'Mahonys GAA, in the Irish town, active Gaelic games club
 Navan R.F.C., in the Irish town, rugby club
 Navan Racecourse, near the Irish town
 Navan Grads, Ontario, Canada, an ice hockey team

Other uses
 Navan (potato cultivar), a potato variety
 Navan liqueur, a vanilla liqueur
 Navan Group, geologic formation in Ireland
 Navan, Inc., an American travel and expense company

See also
 Baron of Navan, in the peerage of Ireland